The Morane-Saulnier MS.138 was a military trainer aircraft produced in France in the late 1920s,

Design and operation
The MS.138 was the major production version of a family that also included the MS.137 and MS.139. The design was derived from the MS.35, first flown during World War I, modernised to feature a wing that now included slight sweepback, and a redesigned fuselage of rounder cross-section.  The basic layout remained the same, being a wire-braced, parasol-wing monoplane with open cockpits in tandem and fixed tailskid undercarriage. Construction was mostly of wood, with the exception of the metal wing spars, and all control surfaces were covered in fabric.

Most of the production run went to the Aéronautique Militaire, with a few others built for the Aéronavale and for military use by Greece and Denmark. Thirty-three others were purchased by civilian operators in France. The type remained in French military service until 1935.

Variants
MS.137version with  Salmson 9Ac engine
MS.138main production type with  Le Rhône 9C engine
MS.139version with  Clerget 9B engine
MS.191version with shortened wingspan and  Clerget 9B engine.

Operators

 Aéronautique Militaire
 Aéronavale

 Hellenic Air Force

 Paraguayan Air Force

Specifications (MS.138)

See also

Notes

References

Further reading

1920s French military trainer aircraft
MS.138
Parasol-wing aircraft
Single-engined tractor aircraft
Aircraft first flown in 1927
Rotary-engined aircraft